Dendrobium pruinosum, commonly known as the honey orchid, is an epiphytic or lithophytic orchid in the family Orchidaceae and has flattened, yellowish stems and pairs of cream coloured, dull yellow or greenish flowers. It grows in tropical North Queensland and New Guinea.

Description 
The flowers are resupinate, cream-coloured, yellow or greenish but only open for a few hours. The side lobes are rounded and the middle lobe has a prominent patch of yellow hairs in its centre. Flowering occurs sporadically throughout the year.

Taxonomy and naming
Dendrobium pruinosum was first formally described in 1862 by Johannes Elias Teijsmann and Simon Binnendijk and the description was published in Natuurkundig tijdschrift voor Nederlandsch Indië. The specific epithet (pruinosum) in a Latin word meaning "frosty".

Distribution and habitat
The honey orchid grows on trees and rocks in rainforest, usually in sunny, humid positions. It occurs in lowland and lower montane forest in New Guinea, on some Torres Strait Islands and from the Iron Range to Tully on the Cape York Peninsula.

References 

pruinosum
Orchids of Queensland
Orchids of New Guinea
Epiphytic orchids
Plants described in 1862